Hallgeir Brenden (10 February 1929 – 21 September 2007) was a Norwegian cross-country skier and steeplechase runner. He competed in various skiing events at the 1952, 1956 and 1960 Winter Olympics and won two individual gold medals in 1952 and 1956 and two silver medals in the 4 × 10 km relay in 1952 and 1960. He also won three events at the Holmenkollen ski festival: 18 km in 1952 and 15 km in 1956 and 1963. He received the Egebergs Ærespris in 1952 and the Holmenkollen medal in 1955.

As a steeplechase runner Brenden won the Norwegian championships in 1953 and 1954.

Cross-country skiing results
All results are sourced from the International Ski Federation (FIS).

Olympic Games
 4 medals – (2 gold, 2 silver)

World Championships

References

External links

 
 Holmenkollen medalists – click Holmenkollmedaljen for downloadable pdf file 
 Holmenkollen winners since 1892 – click Vinnere for downloadable pdf file 

1929 births
2007 deaths
Cross-country skiers at the 1952 Winter Olympics
Cross-country skiers at the 1956 Winter Olympics
Cross-country skiers at the 1960 Winter Olympics
Holmenkollen medalists
Holmenkollen Ski Festival winners
Norwegian male long-distance runners
Norwegian male cross-country skiers
Olympic cross-country skiers of Norway
Olympic gold medalists for Norway
Olympic silver medalists for Norway
People from Trysil
Olympic medalists in cross-country skiing
Medalists at the 1952 Winter Olympics
Medalists at the 1956 Winter Olympics
Medalists at the 1960 Winter Olympics
Norwegian male steeplechase runners
Sportspeople from Innlandet